The 1933 New Year Honours were appointments by King George V to various orders and honours to reward and highlight good works by citizens of the United Kingdom and British Empire. They were announced on 30 December 1932.

The recipients of honours are displayed here as they were styled before their new honour, and arranged by honour, with classes (Knight, Knight Grand Cross, etc.) and then divisions (Military, Civil, etc.) as appropriate.

United Kingdom and British Empire

Baron
Sir Joseph Duveen  Trustee of the National Gallery. Trustee of the Wallace Collection. Trustee of the Imperial College of Art. For public services.
Sir Thomas Jeeves Horder  Senior Physician to St. Bartholomew's Hospital.
Field-Marshal Sir George Francis Milne  Colonel Commandant, Royal Artillery. Master Gunner, St. James's Park. Chief of the Imperial General Staff since 1926.
Sir Charles Alexander Nall-Cain  For political and public services in Lancashire and Hertfordshire.
The Right Honourable Sir (James) Rennell Rodd  Member of Parliament for Marylebone, 1928-32. His Majesty's Ambassador at the Court of the Quirinal, 1908-19. For political and public services.
Sir Walter Runciman  Senior partner of the firm of Walter Runciman & Co., Ltd. Chairman and Managing Director of the Moor line of cargo steamships and many other shipping organisations.

Privy Councillor
The King appointed the following to His Majesty's Most Honourable Privy Council:
The Honourable John Greig Latham  Attorney-General and Minister for External Affairs, and for Industry, Commonwealth of Australia.
Captain Henry David Reginald Margesson  Member of Parliament for the Upton Division of West Ham, 1922–23; and for Rugby since 1924. Assistant Government Whip, 1924. Junior Lord of the Treasury, 1926–29 and Chief Whip since November.

Baronetcies
Frederick Charles Allen, President of the Chamber of Shipping, 1931-32. Chairman of the National Maritime Board. Chairman of the National Council of Port Labour Employers. Chairman of the Shipping Federation.
Captain Sir George Edward Wentworth Bowyer  Member of Parliament for Buckingham since December 1918. Junior Lord of the Treasury, 1927 to June 1929. An Assistant Conservative Whip since 1925. For political and public services.
Sir Ernest Musgrave Harvey  Deputy Governor of the Bank of England.
The Right Honourable (James) Ian Macpherson  Member of Parliament for Boss and Cromarty since 1911. Recorder of Southend since 1931. Undersecretary of State for War, 1914-16. Chief Secretary for Ireland, 1916-20. Minister of Pensions, 1920-22. For political and public services.
Major Sir Robert Spencer-Nairn  President of the Scottish Unionist Association, 19S1-1932. For political and public services.
Sir Owen Seaman  Editor of Punch since 1906.

Knight Bachelor

Walter Galpin Alcock  Organist of Salisbury Cathedral since 1916. For services to music.
Percy Alden, Chairman of the British Institute of Social Service. Honorary Secretary of the Settlements Association. Bursar of the Sir Richard Stapley Educational Trust. A Trustee of the Halley Stewart Trust. Chairman of the Save the Children Fund.
Derwent Hall Caine, Member of Parliament for the Everton Division of Liverpool, 1929-31. For political and public services.
Cornelius Chambers  For political and public services in Birmingham.
Cecil Algernon Cochrane  Chairman of the Council of Armstrong College, University of Durham.
(Ernest George) Stenson Cooke, Secretary of the Automobile Association since 1905.
Montagu Hounsel Cox  Clerk to the London County Council.
Major Frederick William Beresford Cripps   For political and public services in Gloucestershire.
Colonel William Warrington Dobson  Chairman of the Stafford Division Conservative Association for the past 30 years. For political and public services in Staffordshire.
Harriss Firth  Chief Valuer, Board of Inland Revenue.
James Wilson Garner  For political and public services in Bermondsey.
John Hobbis Harris, Parliamentary Secretary to the Anti-Slavery and Aborigines Protection Society.
Harley Hugh Dalrymple-Hay  Consulting Engineer. For his inventions and services in connection with the construction of tube railways.
Ambrose Heal, Chairman and Managing Director of Messrs. Heal and Sons, Ltd. In recognition of his services to the industrial arts and crafts.
Professor Frederick Thomas George Hobday  Principal and Dean of the Royal Veterinary College.
Arthur James Croft Huddleston  lately Economic Adviser to the Sudan Government.
John Peter Todd Jackson  For political services and for public services especially in connection with agricultural co-operation in Lancashire.
Eric Robert Dalrymple Maclagan  Director and Secretary, Victoria and Albert Museum.
Major Alan McLean  Member of Parliament for South-West Norfolk, December, 1923 to May, 1929, and since October, 1931. For political and public services.
Lieutenant-Colonel Watkin Randall Kynaston Mainwaring  For political and public services in North Wales.
Philip Hubert Martineau, Senior partner in the firm of Martineau and Reid. Late President of the Law Society.
William Henry Mountstephen  Chairman of the Devonport Liberal Association. For political and public services.
Lieutenant-Colonel Charles Frederick Oliver  For political and public services in Leicestershire.
Robert Sangster Rait  Principal and Vice-Chancellor of Glasgow University since 1929. Chairman of the Board of Trustees of the National Library of Scotland. 
Eugene Joseph Squire Hargreaves Ramsden  Member of Parliament for Bradford North, October, 1924 to May, 1929, and since October, 1931. For political and public services.
Samuel Thomas Rosbotham  Member of Parliament for Ormskirk since 1929. For political and public services.
Major Isidore Salmon  Member of Parliament for Harrow since October, 1924. Member of the London County Council for eighteen years. For political and public services.
Michael Grieve Thorburn, Convener of Peeblesshire for thirty years. For political and public services in Peeblesshire.

Diplomatic Service and Overseas List
Herbert William Gepp, Consultant to the Government of the Commonwealth of Australia and Chairman of the Consultative Committee advisory to the Commonwealth Government on development.
Alexander Gray  President of the Law Society, Dominion of New Zealand.
The Honourable Walter Kingsmill, President of the Senate, Commonwealth of Australia.
John Lawrence McKelvey. For services to Surgery in the Commonwealth of Australia.
William Perry, President of the Royal Agricultural Society, Dominion of New Zealand.
Alexander Fraser Russell, Chief Justice of Southern Rhodesia.
Alderman the Honourable Samuel Robert Walder, Lord Mayor of Sydney and Member of the Legislative Council of the State of New South Wales.

Colonies, Protectorates, etc.
Edward St. John Jackson  Attorney-General, Ceylon.
Harry Charles Luke  Lieutenant-Governor of the Island of Malta.
James Stanley Rae, Chief Justice of the Leeward Islands.
William Edward Leonard Shenton, Unofficial Member of the Executive and Legislative Councils of Hong Kong. For public services.
Henry William Watlington  Member of the Executive Council and of the House of Assembly of Bermuda. For public services.

British India
Nawab Muhammad Yusuf, Barrister-at-Law, Minister to the Governor of the United Provinces for Local Self-Government.
Malik Feroz Khan Noon, Barrister-at-Law, Minister to the Governor of the Punjab for Education.
Lieutenant-Colonel Richard John Charles Burke, of the Political Department, Resident in Mysore.
Justice Thomas Stewart Macpherson  Indian Civil Service, Puisne Judge of the High Court of Judicature at Patna, Bihar and Orissa.
Sardar Sahib Suleman Cassum Haji Mitha  Merchant, Bombay.
Thomas Ryan  Indian Audit and Accounts Department, Director-General of Posts and Telegraphs.
M. R. Ry. Diwan Bahadur Konkoth Ramunni Menon Avargal, Vice-Chancellor, University of Madras.
George Lethbridge Colvin  Agent, East Indian Railway, Calcutta.
Colonel Cusack Walton  lately Agent, North-Western Railway, Lahore.
Maharaj Singh  United Provinces Civil Service, Agent to the Government of India in South Africa.
Dudley Myers, First President of the European Association in India, and lately Joint Honorary Secretary of the Conservative India Committee.
M. R. Ry. Rao Bahadur Vangal Thiruvenkatachari Krishnamachari Avargal  Madras Civil Service, Dewan of Baroda State.
Khan Bahadur Nawab Liaqat Hayat Khan  Prime Minister, Patiala, Punjab States.
San Crombie Po  Medical Practitioner, and Municipal Commissioner, Bassein, Burma.
Edward Charles Benthall, Head Partner, Messrs. Bird & Co., Calcutta, Bengal.

The Most Ancient and Most Noble Order of the Thistle

Knight of the Most Ancient and Most Noble Order of the Thistle (KT)
The Right Honourable Sir Herbert Eustace Maxwell  Chairman of the Royal Commission on Scottish Historical Monuments, and late Chairman of the Board of Trustees of the National Library of Scotland. President of the Society of Antiquaries of Scotland, 1900-13. Lord Lieutenant of Wigtownshire since 1903.

The Most Honourable Order of the Bath

Knight Grand Cross of the Order of the Bath (GCB)
Military Division
Army
General Sir Charles Harington Harington  Colonel, The King's Regiment (Liverpool), Colonel Commandant, Army Educational Corps, Colonel, 4th/15th Punjab Regiment, Indian Army, Aide-de-camp General to The King, General Officer Commanding-in-Chief, Aldershot Command.

Knight Commander of the Order of the Bath (KCB)
Military Division
Royal Navy
Vice-Admiral Roger Roland Charles Backhouse 
Vice-Admiral Henry Percy Douglas  (Retired).
General Richard Vernon Tredinnick Ford 

Army
Lieutenant-General Archibald Rice Cameron  Colonel, The Black Watch (Royal Highlanders), General Officer Commanding-in-chief designate, Scottish Command.

Royal Air Force
Air Vice-Marshal Edgar Rainey Ludlow-Hewitt  Royal Air Force.

Civil Division
Arthur William Johns 
Sir Frederick William Leith-Ross  Chief Economic Adviser to His Majesty's Government.
Edward Henry Pelham  Permanent Secretary, Board of Education.
Gilbert Charles Upcott  Comptroller arid Auditor General.

Companion of the Order of the Bath (CB)
Military Division
Royal Navy
Rear Admiral Sidney Robert Bailey 
Engineer Rear-Admiral George Preece.
Surgeon Rear-Admiral Herbert Reginald Harry Denny 

Army
Major-General George Henry Addison  (late Royal Engineers), Engineer-in-Chief, Army Headquarters, India.
Major-General John Randle Minshull Minshull-Ford  (late The Royal Welch Fusiliers), Half-Pay List.
Major-General Harry Reginald Walter Marriott Smith  (late Royal Artillery), President, Ordnance Committee, and Royal Artillery Committee.
Major-General Charles Clement Armitage  (late Royal Artillery), Half-Pay List.
Colonel (temporary Brigadier) Herbert Edmund Reginald Rubens Braine  (late The Royal Munster Fusiliers), Commander, 12th (Secunderabad) Infantry Brigade, India.
Colonel (temporary Brigadier) David Forster  (late Royal Engineers), Commander, 13th Infantry Brigade.
Colonel Charles Reed  Indian Army, Inspector of Indian Army Ordnance Services.
Colonel (temporary Brigadier) John Henry Foster Lakin  Indian Army, Commander, Delhi (Independent) Brigade Area, India.
Colonel (temporary Brigadier) David Graeme Ridgeway  Indian Army, Commander, Allahabad Brigade Area, India.
Colonel Kenelm Digby Bold Murray  Indian Army, General Staff Officer, 1st Grade, The War Office.

Royal Air Force
Air Commodore Cuthbert Trelawder Maclean 

Civil Division
Rear-Admiral Richard Augustus Sandys Hill 
Rear-Admiral Francis Loftus Tottenham 
Rear-Admiral Robin Campsie Dalglish.
John Bradley Abraham, Assistant Secretary, Air Ministry.
Colonel Thomas Macdonald Banks  Controller Post Office Savings Bank Department.
Leonard Browett  Principal Assistant Secretary, Board of Trade.
Charles Matthews Bruce  Principal Assistant Secretary, Admiralty.
Bryan Hugh Fell, Principal Clerk, Public Bill Office, House of Commons, and Clerk of the Fees.
Frederick William Leggett, Principal Assistant Secretary (Acting), Ministry of Labour.
Sir Lawrence Margerison  Secretary, National Savings Committee.
Sigismund David Waley  Principal Assistant Secretary, H.M. Treasury.
Colonel Alexander Kirkwood Reid  Territorial Army.

The Most Exalted Order of the Star of India

Knight Grand Commander (GCSI)
Colonel His Highness Maharaja Sir Hari Singh, Indar Mahindar Bahadur Sipar-i-Sultanat  Maharaja of Jammu and Kashmir.

Knight Commander (KCSI)
Sir Joseph William Bhore  Indian Civil Service, Member of the Governor-General's Executive Council.
Harry Graham Haig  Indian Civil Service, Member of the Governor-General's Executive Council.
Captain Nawab Sir Muhammad Ahmad Said Khan  of Chhatari, Member of the Executive Council of the Governor of the United Provinces.
Sir Provash Chandra Mitter  Member of the Executive Council of the Governor of Bengal.
Sir Henry Duffield Craik  Indian Civil Service, Member of the Executive Council of the Governor of the Punjab.
Vice-Admiral Humphrey Thomas Walwyn  Flag Officer Commanding, and Director, Royal Indian Marine.
Sir Reginald Arthur Mant  Member of the Council of India.

Companion (CSI)
Idwal Geoffrey Lloyd, Indian Civil Service, Acting Member of the Executive Council of the Governor of Burma.
Bertrand James Glancy  of the Political Department, Agent to the Governor-General in Central India.
John Collard Bernard Drake  Indian Civil Service, Secretary to the Government of India, Commerce Department.
Charles William Aldis Turner  Indian Civil Service, Chief Secretary to the Government of Bombay, Political Department, and Reforms Officer, Bombay.
Charles Alexander Souter, Indian Civil Service, Member of the Board of Revenue, Madras.
John Austen Hubback, Indian Civil Service, Commissioner, Chota Nagpur Division, and now Officiating Member of the Board of Revenue, Bihar and Orissa.
Digby Livingstone Drake-Brockman  Indian Civil Service, Commissioner, United Provinces.
John Arthur Laing Swan, Indian Civil Service, Chairman, Calcutta Improvement Trust, at present Chairman, Bengal Retrenchment Committee, Bengal.
Arthur Ralph Astbury  Indian Service of Engineers, Secretary to Government (Electricity) and Commercial Manager, Hydro-Electric Branch, Public Works Department, Punjab.

The Most Distinguished Order of Saint Michael and Saint George

Knight Grand Cross of the Order of St Michael and St George (GCMG)
The Right Honourable Sir George Halsey Perley  Minister without Portfolio, Dominion of Canada.
Sir Horace John Wilson  Chief Industrial Adviser to His Majesty's Government in the United Kingdom.

Knight Commander of the Order of St Michael and St George (KCMG)
Admiral Sir Dudley Rawson Stratford de Chair  formerly Governor of the State of New South Wales.
The Honourable Henry Somer Gullett, Minister of State for Trade and Customs, Commonwealth of Australia.
Rupert Beswicke Howorth  Deputy Secretary, Cabinet Office.
The Honourable Harry Sutherland Wightman Lawson, Member for the State of Victoria of the Senate, Commonwealth of Australia; formerly Premier of Victoria.
Frederick Phillips  Under-Secretary, Treasury.
Geoffrey Granville Whiskard  Assistant Under-Secretary of State, Dominions Office.

Colonies, Protectorates, etc.
Herbert Richmond Palmer  Governor and Commander-in-Chief of the Colony of the Gambia.
Colonel Sir Kinahan Cornwallis  Adviser to the Ministry of the Interior, Iraq.

Diplomatic Service and Overseas List
Eric Teichman  Chinese Secretary at His Majesty's Legation in Peking.
Frank Pears Watson  Financial Adviser to the Egyptian Government.
Charles John FitzRoy Rhys Wingfield  His Majesty's Envoy Extraordinary and Minister Plenipotentiary at Oslo.

Companion of the Order of St Michael and St George (CMG)
Captain Henry Thomas Birch-Reynardson, Secretary to the Governor-General of the Union of South Africa.
John Job Crew Bradfield  Government Engineer, Sydney Harbour Bridge, State of New South Wales.
Professor Douglas Berry Copland  Professor of Commerce, University of Melbourne. For services to the Commonwealth of Australia.
Lawrence Ennis  Constructing Engineer for Messrs. Dorman, Long and Company, Sydney Harbour Bridge, State of New South Wales.
Charles Joseph Flynn, Assistant Secretary, Board of Customs and Excise.
Robert Sutherland Forsyth, Representative of the Dominion of New Zealand on the Empire Marketing Board, and Representative in the United Kingdom of the New Zealand Meat Producers Board.
Alan Frederick Lascelles  Secretary to the Governor-General of the Dominion of Canada.
Stuart Gordon McFarlane  Assistant Secretary (Administrative), Treasury, Commonwealth of Australia.
James Marchbanks  lately General Manager, and Chief Engineer, Wellington Harbour Board, Dominion of New Zealand.
Arnold Edersheim Overton  Assistant Secretary, Board of Trade.
Arthur William Street  Principal Assistant Secretary, Ministry of Agriculture and Fisheries.
William James Uglow Woolcock  Chairman of the Committee of Non-official Advisers associated with the Industrial Advisers of the United Kingdom Delegation at the Ottawa Conference.

Colonies, Protectorates, etc.
Captain Gerard Leslie Makins Clauson  Principal, Colonial Office. 
John Ernest William Flood, Assistant Secretary, Colonial Office.
Colonel Will Hodgson Franklin  His Majesty's Trade Commissioner in East Africa; and Commissioner in London for His Majesty's Eastern African Dependencies (Trade and Information) Office.
Walter Burford Johnson  West African Medical Staff, Director of Medical and Sanitary Service, Nigeria.
Arthur Frederick Richards, Governor of the State of North Borneo.
Robert Walter Taylor  Treasurer, Tanganyika Territory.
Colonel Charles William Game Walker  Secretary to the Conference of Governors of the East African Dependencies, and Secretary to the High Commissioner for Transport, Kenya and Uganda.
Colonel John Chappell Ward  Port Director and Director-General of Navigation, Basra, Iraq.

Diplomatic Service and Overseas List
Robert Vickers Bardsley  lately Governor of the Blue Nile Province, Sudan.
Charles St. John Collier, Governor of the Bank of Ethiopia.
Leonard Arthur de Lacy Meredith  Managing Director of the Travel and Industrial Development Association of Great Britain and Ireland.
Maurice Drummond Peterson, a Counsellor in the Foreign Office.
Geoffrey Harrington Thompson, First Secretary at His Majesty's Embassy at Santiago.
Herbert Adolphus Grant Watson, His Majesty's Envoy Extraordinary and Minister Plenipotentiary at Guatemala.
Ralph Follett Wigram, First Secretary at His Majesty's Embassy in Paris.

Honorary Companion
His Highness Abu Bakar ibni Al-Marhum Sultan Abdullah, Sultan of Pahang, Malay States.

Order of the Indian Empire

Knight Grand Commander (GCIE)
Sir Geoffrey Fitzhervey de Montmorency  Governor of the Punjab.
Sir Atul Chandra Chatterjee  Member of the Council of India.

Knight Commander (KCIE)
His Highness Sri Rai-i-Rayan Maharawal Prithi Singh Bahadur, Maharawal of Banswara, Rajputana.
Khan Bahadur Sir Muhammad Usman Sahib Bahadur, Member of the Executive Council of the Governor of Madras.
Brigadier-General Terence Humphrey Keyes  of the Political Department, Resident at Hyderabad.
Walter Frank Hudson  Indian Civil Service, Member of the Executive Council of the Governor of Bombay.
Major-General John Wallace Dick Megaw  Indian Medical Service, Director-General, Indian Medical Service.
Maharajadhiraja Kameshwar Singh, of Darbhanga; landholder, Bihar and Orissa.

Companion (CIE)
Allan Macleod, Indian Civil Service, Financial Adviser, Military Finance, Government of India.
Earn Chandra  Indian Civil Service; Joint Secretary to the Government of India, Department of Education, Health and Lands.
Major-General William Charles Hughan Forster,  Indian Medical Service, Surgeon-General with the Government of Bombay.
Sao Kin Maung, Sawbwa of Mong Mit State, Burma.
James Braid Taylor, Indian Civil Service, Controller of the Currency.
Charles Lyall Philip, Indian Civil Service, Commissioner, Orissa Division, Bihar and Orissa.
Captain Sher Muhammad Khan  Member of the Legislative Assembly, of Jhelum, Punjab.
Edmond Nicolas Blandy, Indian Civil Service, Secretary to the Government of Bengal, Finance, Commerce and Marine Departments.
Noel James Roughton, Indian Civil Service, Secretary to the Government of the Central Provinces, Finance Department.
Charles Gerald Trevor, Indian Forest Service, Chief Conservator of Forests, Punjab and North-West Frontier Province.
Colonel John Norman Walker, Indian Medical Service (retired), Director, Medical Department, and Sanitary Commissioner, His Exalted Highness the Nizam's Government, Hyderabad, Deccan.
Lieutenant-Colonel Robert Beresford Seymour Sewell, Indian Medical Service, Director, Zoological Survey of India.
Lieutenant-Colonel Arthur Henry Eyre Mosse, of the Political Department, Vice-President of the State Council, Bhavnagar, Western India States Agency.
Lieutenant-Colonel Charles Terence Chichele Plowden, of the Political Department, lately Political Agent in Kalat, Baluchistan.
Edgar Stuart Roffey, Member of the Legislative Council, Solicitor, Dibrugarh, Assam.
Vivian Augustus Short, Indian Police Service, Commandant, Frontier Constabulary, North-West Frontier Province.
William Duncan MacGregor,  Posts and Telegraphs Department, lately Postmaster-General, Bengal and Assam.
Lieutenant-Colonel David Seton Johnston, R.E. Chairman, Aden Port Trust and of the Executive Committee of the Aden Settlement, Aden.
Harold Riley Roe, Indian Police Service, Superintendent of Police, United Provinces.
Hugh George Rawlinson  Indian Educational Service, Principal, Deccan College, Poona, Bombay.
John Gordon Cameron Scott, Principal, Prince of Wales Royal Indian Military College, Dehra Dun. 
The Reverend William Herbert Greenland Padfield,  lately Principal and Secretary, Lawrence Memorial Royal Military School, Madras.
Rai Bahadur Pandit Seetla Prasad Bajpai, Chief Justice, Jaipur State, Rajputana.
Khan Bahadur Hafiz Hidayat Husain, Member of the Legislative Council Barrister-at-Law, Cawnpore, United Provinces.
Rai Bahadur Abinash Chandra Banarji, Merchant and Chairman, District Board, Birbhum, Bengal.
David Keith Cunnison, Secretary, Bengal Chamber of Commerce, Calcutta, Bengal.

The Royal Victorian Order

Knight Grand Cross of the Royal Victorian Order (GCVO)
John Charles, The Marquess Camden.
Admiral Sir Montague Edward Browning 
Sir Lionel Earle

Knight Commander of the Royal Victorian Order (KCVO)
Sir Philip Horace Freeman  
Edward Denny Bacon  (dated 21 December 1932).
Frederic Jeune Willans

Commander of the Royal Victorian Order (CVO)
Captain The Lord Claud Nigel Hamilton 
Brigadier-General Archibald Fraser Home 
Major Colin William MacRae 
Colonel Walter Willis Chitty 
Reginald Gerard Leigh 
Robert Uchtred Eyre Knox 
William Hope Fowler 
Frederick Charles Ruddle.

Member of the Royal Victorian Order, 4th class (MVO)
Lieutenant-Commander Eric Langton Woodhall  (dated 8 August 1932). 
Owen Frederick Morshead  
Reginald Stagg

Member of the Royal Victorian Order, 5th class (MVO)
Edward Wyndham Monkhouse 
Andrew Sinclair Buchanan. 
William Johnston (dated 22 August 1932) 
Harry Mercer 
Henry Gulliver Barrett (dated 29 July 1932).

The Most Excellent Order of the British Empire

Knight Commander of the Order of the British Empire (KBE)

Civil Division
Arthur James Dyke  Deputy Chairman of the Board of Customs and Excise.

Colonies, Protectorates, etc.
Sir Gilbert Christopher Vyle, Past President of the Association of British Chambers of Commerce, and one of the Industrial Advisers of the United Kingdom Delegation at the Ottawa Conference.

British India
Khan Bahadur Captain Sardar Sikandar Hayat Khan  Member of the Executive Council of the Governor of the Punjab.

Commander of the Order of the British Empire (CBE)
Military Division
Royal Navy

Army
Lieutenant-Colonel and Brevet Colonel Louis Napoleon George Filon  late Commanding University of London Contingent, Senior Division, Officers Training Corps.
The Reverend George Standing  Chaplain to the Forces, 1st Class, Royal Army Chaplains Department. Deputy Chaplain-General to the Forces, The War Office.

Civil Division
Oswald Barclay  For benefactions and public services in Edinburgh.
Lieutenant-Colonel Alexander Stevenson Blair  Honorary Treasurer of the British Legion (Scotland) and Chairman of the Earl Haig Fund Committee since its formation.
Reginald Blunt Founder and Honorary Secretary of the Chelsea Society. Chairman of the Finance Committee of the Cheyne Hospital for Children for fifty years. Trustee, Carlyle House, since 1895.
Walter Willson Cobbett  Compiler and Editor of the Cyclopaedic Survey of Chamber Music. Chairman of the Corporation of Trinity College of Music. Founder of the Cobbett Free Library of Chamber Music.
Commander Alexander Guthrie Denniston  Head of a Department, Foreign Office.
Oscar Follett Dowson  Assistant Legal Adviser, Home Office.
Peter Macintyre Evans  Vice-Chairman of the Advisory Committee on the Welfare of the Blind.
Robert Samuel Godfrey  Surveyor and Clerk of the Works at Lincoln Cathedral.
Jane Ewing Hannay  Member of the Scottish Savings Committee.
Thomas Henderson  Actuary, Glasgow Savings Bank. Honorary Secretary of the Trustee Savings Bank Association.
Captain John Reid McLean  Commandant Metropolitan Special Constabulary. 
James Gracie Maddan, Postmaster-Surveyor, Manchester.
Francis Hugh Adam Marshall  Fellow of Christ's College, Cambridge and Reader in Agricultural Physiology in the University.
Edward Hugh Rhodes  Assistant Secretary, Ministry of Health.
Sydney William Smith  Chief Assayer, Royal Mint. President of the Institute of Mining and Metallurgy.
George Thorpe  Elected a member of the Board of the Co-operative Wholesale Society 1898. President of the Co-operative Wholesale Society 1920-1924. For services to the Co-operative Movement.
Katharine Talbot Wallas. For services as a member of the late Unemployment Grants Committee.

Diplomatic Service and Overseas List
Arthur Abbott, His Majesty's Consul-General at São Paulo.
Arthur Horace Reid, Assistant Director-General of the Ottoman Bank.
David John Rodgers, His Majesty's Consul at Liege, lately serving at San Salvador.

Colonies, Protectorates, etc.
Edwin Abbott, Deputy Comptroller-General, Department of Trade and Customs, Commonwealth of Australia.
Alice Baker, one of the founders of the Thomas Baker, Alice Baker, and Eleanor Shaw Medical Research Institute, Melbourne, Commonwealth of Australia.
Mabel Balcombe Brookes. For charitable and philanthropic services in the State of Victoria.
Tan Cheng Lock, Nominated Unofficial Member of the Legislative Council of the Straits Settlements. For public services.
George Percival Newton, formerly Under-Secretary, Department of Internal Affairs, Dominion of New Zealand.
John Rutherford Parkin Postlethwaite  lately Provincial Commissioner, Uganda Protectorate.
Julian Ito Piggott  Manager, British Steel Export Association. 
Charles Robert Rennie, lately Provincial Commissioner, Northern Rhodesia.
Colonel George Stops, Commissioner of the British South Africa Police, Southern Rhodesia.
Kingsley Willans Stead  Director, Department of Customs, Excise and Trade, Palestine.
Harold Augustin Tempany  Director of Agriculture, Straits Settlements and Federated Malay States.
Professor Hubert Edwin Whitfield, Vice-Chancellor of the University, State of Western Australia.

British India
Arthur Campbell Armstrong  Indian Police Service, Deputy Inspector-General of Police (Crime and Railways), Central Provinces.
John Dawson Tyson, Indian Civil Service, Private Secretary to His Excellency the Governor of Bengal.

Officer of the Order of the British Empire (OBE)
Military Division
Royal Navy
Surgeon Commander William Harold Edgar  
Paymaster Captain Norman Scott Robertson  (Retired).
Headmaster George Anthony David Brown 

Army
Major (Commissary) Henry Joseph Cheetham  India Miscellaneous List, Officer Supervisor, Quarter Master General's Branch, Army Headquarters, India.
Major Edward Francis Gwynne Davies  Officer Commanding Johore Volunteer Engineers. 
Major Lowry Philip Payne-Gallwey  7th Queen's Own Hussars, Commanding 2nd (Nyasaland) Battalion, The King's African Rifles.
Lieutenant-Colonel (Quarter-Master) William Macpherson, late Extra Regimentally Employed List, late Quarter-Master, Royal Hospital, Chelsea.
Captain Eric John Roderick Mitchell, Machine Gun Company, Hong Kong Volunteer Defence Corps.
Captain James Moffatt, 1st Kumaon Rifles, 19th Hyderabad Regiment, Indian Army, Chief Instructor, Kitchener College, Nowgong (to be dated 21 December 1932).
Major William Ronald Campbell Penney  Royal Corps of Signals, Brigade Major, Shanghai Area.
Lieutenant-Colonel Joseph Elwin Bishop Scrafton, Supernumerary List, Indian Army, Cantonments Department, Inspecting Officer, Military Lands and Cantonments, Northern Command, India (to be dated 21 December 1932).
Captain Douglas Stuart, 1st Battalion, 5th Mahratta Light Infantry, Indian Army, General Staff Officer, 2nd Grade, Headquarters, Lucknow District, India.
Captain (Deputy Commissary) Arthur Edwin Ashton, Indian Corps of Clerks, Chief Clerk, Headquarters, Lahore District, India.
Lieutenant Lionel Attwell Beale, Regular Army Reserve of Officers, Royal Corps of Signals (to be dated 21 December 1932).
Lieutenant (Quarter-Master) Edgar Arthur Carter, Extra Regimentally Employed List, Clerk to the Overseas Defence Committee.
Honorary Captain Faujdar Singh, Cantonments Department, Executive Officer, Class II, Rawalpindi, India.
Captain Frederick Charles Trevett Lyall, The Royal Fusiliers (City of London Regiment), Station Staff Officer, 1st Class, Rawalpindi, India (to be dated 21 December 1932).
Risaldar Noor Ahmed, No. 13 Army Transport Company (Mule), Indian Army Service Corps.
Honorary Captain Peter Donald Pelpola, Assistant Adjutant, Ceylon Cadet Battalion, Ceylon Defence Force.
Captain (Deputy Commissary) George Archibald Richards, Indian Corps of Clerks, Headquarters, Western Command, India (to be dated 21 December 1932).
Major Percy Neil Sandways, India Medical Department, British Military Hospital, Trimulgherry, India.
Major (Commissary) Hector Walsh, India Miscellaneous List, Officer Supervisor, Master-General of the Ordnance Branch, Army Headquarters, India.
Second Lieutenant Harry Hector Adie Whitson, The Bombay Battalion, Auxiliary Force, India.

Civil Division
Frederick William Abbott  Chief Constable, Metropolitan Police. 
Robert Askew Assistant Chief Constable, Lancashire County Constabulary. 
Alderman Charles Aveling  Chairman of the Southport Local Employment Committee since its formation.
Alderman Francis James Ballard. Mayor of Dudley, 1927-28. For public services in Dudley. 
The Reverend Alfred Barrett. A member of the Monmouthshire County Council. For services to local government in Wales. 
Alfred Edward Baxter  A member of the National Savings Committee.
Vivian Harry Boyse  Accountant, Dominions and Colonial Offices.
Thomas Chadwick  Accountant, His Majesty's Treasury.
Margaret Elizabeth Cleeve. A senior member of the staff of the Royal Institute of International Affairs.
Alfred Vincent Elsden  War Department Chemist, Royal Arsenal, Woolwich.
Lilian Annie Margueretta Franklin  Lately Commandant of the First Aid Nursing Yeomanry Corps.
Helen Gower  Chairman of the Women's Unionist Association, Pontypool Division. For political and public services in Monmouthshire.
John Hooper  Chief Technical Officer for Furniture, His Majesty's Office of Works and Public Buildings.
Alice Mabel Erskine Jackson  Convener of the Women's Committee of the Eastern Divisional Council of the Scottish Unionist Association. For political and public services.
Thomas Gwynfab James  A member of the National Savings Committee.
Edward Knox  Chairman of the Frome Rural District Council. 
Harry Wesson Longley, Director of Stamping, Board of Inland Revenue.
Alexander McCallum Senior Inspector for Agricultural Education, Department of Agriculture for Scotland.
Alick Henry Herbert Maclean Secretary, Girls Public Day School Trust.
Donald James Macleod  Honorary Chieftain, Gaelic Society of Inverness. For services to Gaelic studies.
John Palmer Scott Main  Assistant to the Chief Inspecting Officer of Railways, Ministry of Transport.
Charles Henry Martin Late Assistant Registrar-General.
Winifred Mercier  Principal, Whitelands Training College, Putney.
Charles James Mills, Superintending Inspector, Board of Customs and Excise.
William Cleverly Osmond, Deputy Director of Training, Ministry of Labour.
Fred Pickering  One of the Magistrates for the City of Bradford; Deputy Chairman of the Unemployment Committee; Chairman of the local Income Tax Commissioners. For public services in Bradford.
Edward Llewellyn Pickles  Assistant Director of Contracts, Air Ministry.
Ewart Watson Ravenshear Principal, Mines Department of the Board of Trade.
Violet Roberta Stewart-Richardson. Establishment Clerk, Treasurer's Office, Buckingham Palace.
John Robertson Chief Constable of Renfrew and Bute. James Charles Stibbs Assistant Accountant-General, India Office. 
Frederick Henry Taylor, Chief Staff Officer, Board of Trade.
Florence Thorneycroft. For political and public services in Staffordshire.
Frederic Weston, Superintending Naval Store Officer, His Majesty's Dockyard, Devonport.
Commander Alfred James Windebank  (retired). Chairman of the Herefordshire War Pensions Committee.

Diplomatic Service and Overseas List
Falconer Evans Crowe, Retiring President of the British Chamber of Commerce in Switzerland.
Agnes Gibson  Headmistress of St. Andrew's School for Girls, Alexandria. 
Douglas Newbold, District Commissioner, Sudan.
Arthur Joseph Pack, Commercial Secretary at His Majesty's Embassy at Santiago.
Douglas Gerald Rydings, His Majesty's Vice-Consul at Paris, lately serving at Monrovia, Liberia.
Robert Charles Owen-Wells  formerly British Agent and Secretary on the Anglo-Turkish Mixed Arbitral Tribunal.

Colonies, Protectorates, etc.
Arthur Edward Victor Barton, Collector of Customs and Excise, Colony of Trinidad and Tobago.
Harry Blackmore  Director of Education, Sierra Leone.
August Bolle, Loans Officer, Department of the Treasury, Commonwealth of Australia.
Edith Charlotte Onians. For child welfare work in the State of Victoria. 
John Thomas Bradley  Chief Medical Officer, Seychelles.
Frank Cecil Clarkson  Commissioner of the Virgin Islands.
Frederick James Durman, Assistant Chief Secretary, Tanganyika Territory. 
John Medlicott Ellis, Colonial Secretary, Falkland Islands.
Alexander Murdoch Fraser, Elected Member of the Legislative Council of Saint Vincent. For public services.
Joseph Trounsell Gilbert  Assistant Chief Secretary, Zanzibar. 
William Harold Ingrams, Assistant Colonial Secretary, Mauritius.
William Marston Logan, Principal Assistant Commissioner for Local Government Lands and Settlement, Kenya.
Sheffield Airey Neave  Assistant Director, Imperial Institute of Entomology.
Max Nurock, Assistant Secretary, Palestine.
Charlotte Purnell  For long and devoted medical work amongst the Arabs in Palestine and Trans-Jordan.
Eric Slack  Medical Officer, Leper Settlement, Botshabelo, Basutoland.
Harry Lester Smith, Chief Clerk, Office of the High Commissioner for South Africa.
George Alexander Whitlam, Officer in the Prime Minister's Department, Commonwealth of Australia.
Thomas Traill Smellie, Unofficial Member of the Executive and Legislative Councils of British Guiana. For public services.
John Smith  Director of Animal Health and Acting Secretary for Agriculture, Northern Rhodesia.
Robert Stanley Taylor  East African Medical Service. Principal Medical Officer, Somaliland Protectorate.

British India
Douglas Eric Augier, Indian Opium Department, Joint Opium Officer for Central India and Rajputana, Joint Scheme States, Central India.
Denzil Harold Cowper, Jail Department, Superintendent, Karachi District Prison, Bombay.
Khan Bahadur Kuli Khan; Provincial Civil Service, Supernumerary Assistant Commissioner and Publicity. Officer, North-West Frontier Province.
Hector Ian Macdonald  Director, Regulations and Forms, Army Department, Government of India.
Mitharam Pribhdas Mathrani, Indian Service of Engineers, Executive Engineer, Left Works Division, Lloyd Barrage Circle, Sukkur, Bombay.
Harry Willoughby Oddin Taylor  Indian Service of Engineers, Executive Engineer, Right Works Division, Lloyd Barrage Circle, Sukkur, Bombay.

Honorary Officers
Musa Effendi El Alami, Assistant Government Advocate, Palestine.

Member of the Order of the British Empire (MBE)
Military Division
Royal Navy
Shipwright Lieutenant Walter Thomas Ford Miller  
Commissioned Engineer Victor Gordon Scott  
Senior Chief Officer (Shore Wireless Service) Francis Weaver Johnston 

Civil Division
John William Bateman Adams  Headmaster, Christ Church Senior School, Hampshire. 
Albert George Banks, Clerical Officer, Cabinet Office.
Henry James Frederick Barber, member of the staff of the Conservative Central Office for the past 28 years. For political services.
Sydney Charles Barham, Acting Assistant Accountant, Ministry of Health.
Edwin Percy Bennett Chief Superintendent, Birmingham City Police.
Edward Abel Ely Engineer and Manager of the Crinan Canal, Ministry of Transport.
Nina Mary Popham Blyth. Juvenile Court Probation Officer.
Thomas Atkinson Bourne, Accountant, Board of Customs and Excise.
Walter Thomas Brattle, Superintendent Storekeeper, Lambeth Police Store.
William Henry Cann. Principal Clerk, Post Office Savings Bank Department.
George William Collins, Superintendent, Metropolitan Police.
Jessie Reid Crosbie, Headmistress, Infants Department, Salisbury Council School, Liverpool.
William Percival Daniels, Civil Assistant to the Director of Naval Ordnance, Admiralty.
Elizabeth Date Davis (Sister Lillie Davis). Founded the Sister Lillie Shelter at Silloth, Cumberland. For her services in Carlisle and District.
John Hanks, Day Controller, Maidstone Centre, Observer Corps (Maidstone Special Constabulary).
Richard Deacon, Clerk, Higher Grade, Board of Inland Revenue. 
George William Downs, Chief Superintendent, Nottingham City Police.
Leah Francesca Mary Edmonds, Administrative Assistant, War Office. 
William Eyre, Confidential Shorthand Writer, Board of Trade.
Percy Lovell Godley, Chief Superintendent, Control Division, Ordnance Survey, Southampton.
Arthur Clement Hamilton, Staff Officer, Air Ministry. 
Frederick George Hanham, Second Class Officer, Ministry of Labour.
Mabel Molyneux Hankins, Headmistress, Grayhurst Road Senior Girls School, Shoreditch.
Wilfrid John Hewkley , Superintending Estate Surveyor, His Majesty's Office of Works & Public Buildings.
Percy Reginald Clive Hidden, Officer in Charge of Ministry of Pensions Archives Registry, Hollinwood.
William Frederick Jacobs, Superintendent, Hampshire County Constabulary.
Mary Eleanor Elizabeth James  In recognition of her public service in the Borough of Bethnal Green.
Horace John Johns, Staff Officer, Ministry of Agriculture and Fisheries.
Frederick William Judge, Rating Officer, Ipswich County Borough.
James Hamilton Kelly  For political and public services in the West of Scotland.
Robert Ponton Kerr, Staff Clerk, War Office.
Walter Kettle, Clerk, Higher Grade, lately of the Joint Substitution Board (Treasury and Ministry of Labour).
Thomas Kidd  Chairman of the Burton-on-Trent, Lichfield and District. War Pensions Committee.
Robert John Lawrence, Higher Executive-Officer (Acting), Export Credits Guarantee Department.
Thomas Smeeton Leah. For services in connection with the National Mark Beef Scheme.
Hilda Victoria Emily Hart Lupton, Clerical Officer, Board of Trade.
Sidney Alfred Lynn, First Class Clerk, Royal Courts of Justice.
Jane McDermont, a Mistress at James Gillespie's High School for Girls, Edinburgh.
Angus Macdonald, lately Superintendent Relieving Officer, Camberwell Board of Guardians.
(Lorna) Eilidh Louisa MacDougall. For services in connection with the Mary Leaf Fund established for promoting the welfare of women and girls in the Metropolitan Police District.
Henry McLeod, Superintendent, Higher Grade, East Central District Office, General Post Office.
Mary Stuart Miller, Chief Juvenile Employment Officer of the Birmingham Local Education Authority.
Dorothy Newcombe. In recognition of her work for the patients at the Ministry of Pensions Hospitals in Newcastle.
Francis William Norledge, Securities Officer, Public Trustee Office. 
Charles Petty, Shipping Master, Armament Supply Department, Admiralty.
Lilian Alice Annie Plincke, Chief Superintendent of Typists, Board of Education.
Anna Albertina Isabel Pollard, Chief Inspector of Midwives and Superintendent of Health Visitors, County Council of Middlesex.
Caroline Wingfield Raxworthy, Chairman of the Children's Sub-Committee of the Guildford, Aldershot and District War Pensions Committee.
Charles Frederick Stuart, Inspector, Office of the Inspector-General of Waterguard, Board of Customs and Excise.
Robert Sweeney, Superintendent, Central Division, Glasgow City Police. 
Alfred Ernest Thomas, Secretary, Middlesbrough Juvenile Organisations Committee.
William Henry Walton, Chief Superintendent, Mercantile Marine Office, Board of Trade, Newcastle.
Thomas Skinner Ward In recognition of his services to the Ministry of Pensions Hospitals in the Glasgow area.
Maurice Arthur Willis, Clerical Officer, Dominions Office.

Diplomatic Service and Overseas List
Bimbashi Alexander Dugald Fraser, Inspector, Cairo City Police.
Edward William Longworth Knocker, employed in the Department of the Commercial Counsellor at His Majesty's Embassy at Rome.
Frederick William Shirley, British Consular Agent, Minia.
Mildred Walkley, a British resident, and worker for charity, in Khartoum.

Colonies, Protectorates, etc.
Maurice Bookham, Deputy Assistant Superintendent of Prisons, Colony of Trinidad and Tobago.
Montague-Brown, Chief Clerk, Department of Agriculture and Forests, Palestine. 
William Brown, Superintendent of Police, Gibraltar.
John Coelho, Assistant Crown Surveyor and Assistant Engineer, Public Works Department, Gibraltar.
May Evans, Senior Nursing Sister, Nursing Home, Baghdad, Iraq.
Thomas Richard Ginger  Inspector of Water Supplies, Public Works Department, Kenya.
Georgina Rose Johnson, Superintendent of Female Education, Zanzibar.
Margaret Lowe. For social welfare work in Northern Rhodesia. 
Evangeline Louise Peries. For social welfare work in Ceylon.
Thomas Irwin Potter. For public services in the Colony of Trinidad and Tobago.
Shankar Rao Eranna Furam, Sub-Assistant Surgeon, Tanganyika Territory.
Aubrey Harris Silver, Bandmaster, Department of Police and Prisons, Palestine.
Subadar Kishen Singh, Medical Department, Kenya.
Robert Burnell Skinner, Treasurer and Collector of Customs, Antigua, and Federal Treasurer, Leeward Islands.
William James Walker, lately Town Clerk of Kingston and St. Andrew, Jamaica. For public services.
Henry Nevill Williams, Assistant Engineer, Irrigation Department, Iraq. 
Herbert Frank Wilton, Head Keeper, Hamilton Gaol, Bermuda.

British India
Chamier Birch, Superintendent, Political Branch, North-West Frontier Province Secretariat.
Alfred Bux, Superintendent of Accounts, Office of the Private Secretary to the Governor of the United Provinces.
Richard Joseph Henry Fitzpatrick, Inspector-General of Police, Tonk State, Rajputana.
Joseph Leonard Jaques (retired), Deputy Collector and lately President of the First Class Bench Court, Calicut, Malabar District, Madras.
Rai Bahadur Sohan Lai, lately of the Punjab Civil Service, Secretary, Municipal Committee, Delhi.
James John Minto, Principal Foreman, Kirkee Arsenal. 
Sheikh Faiz Muhammad  of Dera Ghazi Khan, Punjab.
Charles Henry Francis Pereira, Assistant Secretary to the Government of India in the Legislative Department.
William Mathew Schutte  Indian Agricultural Service, Agricultural Engineer to the Government of Bombay.
James Woolley  Assistant Commissioner of Police, Headquarters, Lalbazar, Calcutta, Bengal.

Honorary Members
Michaelaki Shishmanoglou, Assistant Senior Medical Officer of Health, Palestine.

Members of the Order of the Companions of Honour (CH) 

The Reverend Philip Thomas Byard Clayton  Vicar of All Hallows, Barking-by-the-Tower. Founder of Talbot House. 
The Reverend John Scott Lidgett  President of the Methodist Church. Honorary Secretary of the National Council of Evangelical Free Churches of England and Wales since 1914. Vice-Chancellor of London University 1930-31 and 1931-32. Warden of the Bermondsey Settlement since 1891.

Kaisar-i-Hind Medal
First Class
Deaconess Jane Blissett Bardsley, Church of England Zenana Mission, Katni, Central Provinces.
Sister Dorothy Frances  Honorary Principal, Diocesan College, Calcutta, Bengal.
Charlotte Rose Greenfield, Medical Officer in charge of St. Margaret's Hospital, Poona, Bombay.
Agatha Rosalie, Lady Innes (wife of Sir Charles Innes, lately Governor of Burma).
M. R. Ry. Tiruvarur Swaminatha Ayyar Ramaswami Ayyar Avargal, lately President, Corporation of Madras.
Muazzim Husain Muhammad Furrokh, Bengal Civil Service, Sub-Divisional Officer, Tangail, Mymensingh District, Bengal.
M. R. Ry. Rao Sahib Gidugu Venkata Ramamurti Pantulu Garu, Parlakimidi, Ganjam District, Madras.
Robert Harold Hull Goheen, Medical Missionary in charge of the American Presbyterian Mission Hospital at Vengurla, Ratnagiri District, Bombay.
The Right Reverend Kenneth William Stewart Kennedy  Bishop of Chota Nagpur, Bihar and Orissa.
The Reverend Williams Sherratt, lately Secretary, British and Foreign Bible Society, Burma.

British Empire Medal (BEM)

Military Division
For Meritorious Service
Sergeant William Dunlop Carroll, Royal Army Service Corps, Military Headquarters, Shanghai Area.

Civil Division
For Gallantry
Mirghany Ahmed Mohammed. Citation: "On September 18th, 1932, at the height of the Nile flood, and at a point where the stream is particularly dangerous even for the strongest swimmer, Mirghany Ahmed rescued three girls, the eldest fifteen years of age, from certain death by drowning."

For Meritorious Service
Charles Crunden Phelps. Chief Inspector, Metropolitan Special Constabulary Reserve.
Thomas Lister. Civilian Clerk to Commander, Royal Artillery, 47th (2nd London) Division, Territorial Army.
Harry Whent. Clerk, War Department Experimental Establishment, Shoeburyness. 
Frank Ray, Head Gardener and Caretaker, Imperial War Graves Commission, France. 
Mir Alam Khan. Sub-Inspector of Indian Police, Admiralty Dockyard, Hong Kong. 
Osman Suleiman. Permanent Way Foreman, Sudan Railways.
Saleh Allagabo. Chief of Wan Town, Sudan. Lately Bash Shawi'sh (Sergeant-Major) Ba-hr el Ghazal Province Police Force.
Hamid Effendi Abdulla Sol (Warrant Officer) Kordofan Province Police, Sudan. 
Mahmoud Effendi Abd El Karim. Assistant Superintendent of Customs, Sudan. 
Frank Fletcher. Reserve Inspector of Police, United Provinces, India.
Frederick George Peters  Reserve Inspector of Police, Nagpur, Central Provinces, India.
Oliver Alexander Chidgey. Messenger and personal attendant to successive Prime Ministers of the Commonwealth of Australia since 1921, and Principal Messenger to the Federal Cabinet.
Raymond John Tracy. Chauffeur to the Prime Minister of the Commonwealth of Australia.
Previously Chauffeur to Ministers of the Commonwealth since 1919. 
Joshua Constant. Lately 3rd Class Officer, Prison Service, Trinidad.
Savvas Papanicolaou. Mukhtar of Stroumbi, Paphos District, Cyprus.

Air Force Cross
Flight Lieutenant Eric Delano Barnes. 
Flight Lieutenant Charles Howard Cahill.

Air Force Medal
Sergeant (Pilot) Ernest Charles Kidd. 
Sergeant (Pilot) James Hughes Jones.

King's Police Medal (KPM)

For Gallantry
England and Wales
Thomas Danby, Chief Constable, of the Liberty of Peterborough constabulary and of the Peterborough City Police Force. 
Captain Archibald Frederick Hordern  Chief Constable of the East Riding of Yorkshire. 
Thomas Bell, Chief Constable, Bootle Borough Police Force. 
Captain Alberto Charles Dawson, Chief Constable, Birkenhead Borough Police Force 
Frederic Edward Crack, Chief Superintendent, Hull City Police Force. 
Joseph Adams, Superintendent, Staffordshire Constabulary. 
Gilbert Alexander McDowall, Superintendent, West Riding of Yorkshire Constabulary.
Edward Seymour Woodeson  Superintendent and Deputy Chief Constable, Norfolk Constabulary. 
William Francis Milsom, Superintendent, Worcestershire Constabulary. 
Arthur Thompson, Superintendent, Leeds City Police Force. 
Harry Battley, Chief Inspector, Metropolitan Police Force. 
George Duncan, Chief Inspector, Metropolitan Police Force. 
Walter Calver, Sub-Divisiona, Inspector, Metropolitan Police Force.
William Cain, Detective Inspector, Metropolitan Police Force.
Robert Wallen, Sergeant, Metropolitan Police Force.
Collingwood Arnold, Sergeant, Eastbourne Borough Police Force.
Herbert Cockburn, Constable, Metropolitan Police Force.
Sidney Pattenden, lately Constable, Metropolitan Police Force.
Alfred Scheide, Constable, Metropolitan Police Force.
Robert Swan, Constable, Metropolitan Police Force.
Herbert. Hayes, Constable, Lancashire Constabulary.
James. Tinlin, Constable, Northumberland Constabulary.
Edgar Harold Olpin, Constable, Somerset Constabulary.
William Alexander Marr, Constable, Oldham Borough Police Force.
Cyril Simmons, Constable, Eastbourne Borough Police Force.
William MacKay, Deputy Firemaster, Dundee.

Scotland
James Lowden, Chief Constable, Ayr Burgh Police Force.

Australia
Arthur Leary, Metropolitan Superintendent, New South Wales Police Force. 
William John MacKay, Metropolitan Superintendent, New South Wales Police Force. 
Christopher George Digby, Fourth Officer, Board of Fire Commissioners, New South Wales. 
James Sorlie, Divisional Inspector, Board of Fire Commissioners, New South Wales.
Albert Henry Jackson, Senior Constable, Tasmanian Police Force.

Union of South Africa
Diederik Johannes Steyn, Lance-Sergeant, South African Police Force.

British India
Frederick Douglas Bartley  Deputy Commissioner of Police, Bengal. (bar to the King's Police Medal)
Narindar Singh, Sub-Inspector, Punjab Police. (bar to the King's Police Medal)
Shaik Jamal Ahmad, Head Constable, Madras Police.
Cecil Justin Philomen Pinto, Inspector, Madras Police.
Ramaswami Pillai Muthuswami Pillai, Constable, Madras Police.
Lalkhan Abdullakhan, Head Constable, Bombay Police. 
Babaji Jiwaji, Head Constable, Bombay Police.
George Edward Hartnup, Sergeant, Bombay Police. 
Walter Robert George Smith, Deputy Commissioner of Police, Bombay.
Harold Edwin Butler, Deputy Commissioner of Police, Bombay. 
Michael Edward Guider, Deputy Commissioner of Police, Bombay.
Jnanendra Nath De, Head Constable, Bengal Police.
Lal Muhammad Joarder, Officiating Assistant Sub-Inspector, Bengal Police.
Jamadar Singh, Constable, Bengal Police.
Deoraj Ram, Constable, Bengal Police.
Berhamdeo Singh, Constable, Bengal Police. 
Henrick Ericksen Hansen, Deputy Commissioner of Police, Bengal. 
Bhujendra Nath Sarker, Inspector, Bengal Police. 
Mafizuddin Ahmed, Officiating Inspector, Bengal Police. 
Sasadhar Mazumdar, Officiating Inspector, Bengal Police.
Denys Pilditch, Assistant to the Deputy Inspector General of Police, Criminal Investigation Department, United Provinces.
Pirthi Singh, Constable, United Provinces Police.
Sheikh Edu, Naik, United Provinces Police.
Ram Rattan Singh, Officiating Deputy Superintendent, United Provinces Police.
Sarwar Khan, Constable, Punjab Police.
Khem Singh, Constable, Punjab Police.
Kishan Chand, Constable, Government Railway Police, Punjab.
Dayal Singh, Head Constable, Punjab Police.
Teo Hmong  Subedar, Burma Military Police. 
Nazir Singh Lama, Subedar, Burma Military Police. 
Captain Lawrence Gamble  Burma Military Police. 
Captain Eugene Daniel McCarthy  Burma Military Police.
Boota Singh, Jemadar, Burma Military Police.
U Tun Tin, Sub-Inspector, Burma Police.
Rai Sahib Ajit Kumar Ganguli, Inspector of Police, Criminal Investigation Department, Bihar and Orissa.
Khagendra Nath Chatterji, Sub-Inspector, Bihar and Orissa Police.
Ram Bahadur Singh, Constable, Bihar and Orissa Police. 
Clarence James Creed  Superintendent, Bihar and Orissa Police. 
Frank Herbert Graham Taylor, Superintendent, Central Provinces Police.
Vernon Thomas Bay ley, Assistant Superintendent, North-West Frontier Province Police.
Mohammad Nazir Khan, Sub-Inspector, North-West Frontier Province Police.
Abbas Ali, Assistant Sub-Inspector, North-West Frontier Province Police.
Abdul Rauf, Officiating Assistant Sub-Inspector, North-West Frontier Province Police.
Mir Afzal, Lance Head Oonstable, North-West Frontier Province Police.
Rab Nawaz, Constable, North-West Frontier Province Police.
Gul Badshah, Head Constable, Baluchistan Police.
Basil Churton Taylor, Inspector General, Indore State Police.
Bhagwan Singh, Superintendent, Patiala State Police.

Colonies, Protectorates and Mandated Territories 
Stanley Charles Sinclair, Assistant Commissioner of Police, Gold Coast. (for gallantry)
Adolphus Harry Leeves, British Inspector of Police, Palestine. (for gallantry)
Audu Zaria, First Class Constable, Nigeria Police Force.
Douglas John Gerrard Hennessy, Superintendent of Police, Ceylon.
Eustice Forbes Lanyon Penno, Assistant Commissioner of Police, Gold Coast. 
Peter Grant, Chief Inspector of Police, Hong Kong.
Wilfred Edmund Power, Inspector of Constabulary and Superintendent of the Port-of-Spain Fire Brigade, Trinidad.
Philip Nathaniel Kendall, Sergeant Major of Constabulary attached to the Port-of-Spain Fire Brigade, Trinidad.
Qaid Sudqi Bey Qasim, Commandant, Belqa District, Arab Legion, Trans-Jordan.

His Majesty has also graciously consented to the King's Police Medal being handed to the next-of-kin of the deceased officers whose names appear below, and who would have received the decoration had they survived:
Narathoo, lately Jemadar of Peons in the Foreign and Political Department, Government of India.

References

New Year Honours
1933 in Australia
1933 in Canada
1933 in India
1933 in New Zealand
1933 in the United Kingdom
1933 awards